Pak Chang-ok (1896–1960) was a North Korean official and was a leader of the Soviet Korean faction of the Workers' Party of Korea (WPK), with members being mainly ethnic Koreans born in Soviet Union, after the suicide of their first leader, Ho Ka-i.

Pak was a member of the Central Committee of the WPK, and the Chairman of the State Planning Commission. He was appointed Vice-Premier of North Korea in March 1954.

Pak formed an alliance Choe Chang-ik and the Yanan Korean faction of the party to criticize Kim Il-sung in 1956, but was expelled following Kim's return from the Soviet Union. Pak died in 1960.

References

Works cited

1960 deaths
Date of birth missing
Date of death missing
Vice Chairmen of the Workers' Party of Korea and its predecessors
Members of the 1st Supreme People's Assembly
People from North Hamgyong
People from Onsong County